Sideroxylon rubiginosum is a species of plant in the family Sapotaceae. It is endemic to the Dominican Republic.

References

Endemic flora of the Dominican Republic
rubiginosum
Critically endangered plants
Taxonomy articles created by Polbot